is a railway station in Miyagino-ku, Sendai, Miyagi Prefecture, Japan, operated by East Japan Railway Company (JR East).

Lines
Rikuzen-Takasago Station is served by the Senseki Line.

Station layout
The station has two opposed side platforms connected to the station building by a footbridge. The station has a "Midori no Madoguchi" staffed ticket office.

Platforms

History
Rikuzen-Takasago Station opened on June 5, 1925 as a station on the Miyagi Electric Railway. The line was nationalized on May 1, 1944. The station was absorbed into the JR East network upon the privatization of JNR on April 1, 1987. A new station building was completed in June 2011.

Passenger statistics
In fiscal 2018, the station was used by an average of 5,438 passengers daily (boarding passengers only).

Surrounding area
Fukumuro district (residential)
Fukumuro Elementary School

See also
 List of railway stations in Japan

References

External links

  

Railway stations in Sendai
Senseki Line
Railway stations in Japan opened in 1925
Stations of East Japan Railway Company